Smoky Joe's Cafe, a novel by Bryce Courtenay, deals with the psychological and physical scars on Thommo left by the Vietnam War and Agent Orange. When it is discovered his daughter has leukaemia, his veteran mates band together as "The Dirty Dozen" behind a scheme to grow marijuana and convert it to "Hash Honey". With the assistance of Thommo's wife Wendy and a North Vietnamese veteran, the scheme is a success, and the money raised helps pay for a bone marrow transplant from a previously unknown part-aboriginal cousin found in the town of Daintree.

The book ends with Thommo's daughter writing after her father's death about his life, last days and the 2000 ANZAC Day.

2001 novels
Novels by Bryce Courtenay